Miles Welles (also Wyllen) (fl. 1530s) was a Canon of Windsor from 1526 to 1535.

Career
He was appointed:
Prebendary of Woodforth in Salisbury 1524
Rector of King’s Chapel in the Tower of London in 1526
King’s Chaplain
Vicar of Stepney 1534
Rector of Guynes 1535
Rector of Willingham 1535
Master of the Hospital of Newton Carth, Yorkshire 1535

He was appointed to the first stall in St George's Chapel, Windsor Castle in 1526, and held the stall until 1535. He was imprisoned in the Tower for treason in 1535, and pardoned in 1536 - 7.

Notes 

Canons of Windsor
Prisoners in the Tower of London